Flashback is a 1990 American adventure comedy film starring Dennis Hopper, Kiefer Sutherland, and Carol Kane. The film is written by David Loughery and directed by Franco Amurri.

Plot

Huey Walker (Dennis Hopper) is a hippie and a former New Left radical (in the vein of Abbie Hoffman) who has been on the run from the law for 20 years for something he did not do, disconnecting Spiro Agnew's train car in Spokane, Washington. John Buckner (Kiefer Sutherland) is an FBI agent who is set to transport Walker back to Spokane for trial.

Their journey forces them to cross paths with a corrupt Sheriff Hightower and the two end up fleeing for their lives. As the story progresses, it is revealed that Buckner was raised on a communal farm and that his given name is Free. As Buckner learns to reconcile his past with his present, Walker does as well.

Cast
 Dennis Hopper as Huey Walker
 Kiefer Sutherland as Free "John" Buckner
 Carol Kane as Maggie
 Paul Dooley as Stark
 Cliff De Young as Sheriff Rand Hightower
 Richard Masur as Barry
 Michael McKean as Hal Cresciman
 Kathleen York as Sparkle

Reception
The film received mixed reviews.

Vincent Canby in The New York Times stated,
About 30 minutes before it's over, Flashback begins to go to pieces, like someone who has overdosed on carrot juice and organic marzipan. The movie becomes woozy and sort of distraught. Until then, it's an engaging comedy about the confrontation of a superannuated flower child of the 1960s and a 26-year-old representative of the clean-shaven, cholesterol-conscious, fiercely conservative 1980s.

The Los Angeles Times critic Peter Rainer stated: 
In "Flashback" (citywide), the casting of Dennis Hopper as an Abbie Hoffman-like radical prankster is weirdly dislocating. Still primarily identified with "Easy Rider," Hopper is the shaggy archetype of '60s hippie anomie. [...] Despite his scraggly derelict's appearance and screw-loose antics, he is wised-up and politically right on. He is, God help us, the conscience of the '60s. And that's where the dislocation comes in. Hopper represents the fringes of hippiedom for us, yet his character here is also being promoted as a robust politico—an Abbie Hoffman in Rip Van Winkle drag.

Remarked Roger Ebert, 
I've heard people complaining recently that once you've seen the coming attractions trailer for a movie, you've seen the movie. That's the way I felt after seeing the trailer for Franco Amurri's Flashback, but the film itself is a pleasant surprise - deeper and more original than the formula that the trailer seems to promise.

The then-new Entertainment Weekly magazine gave the film a B+, stating: 
Ever since the mythic ’60s ended, countercultural idealists have been grappling with the loss of what they believed would be their eternal youth. Considering how many serious books and movies have addressed the aging of the Woodstock generation, it’s surprising to find Flashback, a seemingly insubstantial film that has something important to say on the subject. [...] Screenwriter David Loughery cleverly builds this simple role reversal into an affecting vehicle for exploring identity and growth. Against all odds, the movie manages to avoid easy caricatures. [...] Unlike many such voyages through the past, this is one ’60s trip that’s worth repeating.

Based on 15 reviews, the film has a score of 40% on Rotten Tomatoes.

Box office
The film debuted at number 5.

Soundtrack
The film produced a fairly popular soundtrack made up of a mix of 1960s and 1980s alternative music. The highlight is the theme song "Free" by the band Big Audio Dynamite, which is only available on this soundtrack; it was never included in any Big Audio Dynamite album, although the single edit appears on their compilation Planet B.A.D. . A remake of the song, titled "Kickin' In", was later recorded by Big Audio Dynamite II and included on the Kool-Aid album. Bob Dylan's version of Curtis Mayfield's "People Get Ready" is also only available on this soundtrack, as it hasn't yet been released on any Dylan album or any of his many box sets or Bootleg Series releases, although a different version that Dylan recorded in 1975 is available on iTunes as a bonus track on Bob Dylan: The Collection.

Track Listing
 "Free" – Big Audio Dynamite
 "Fatal Attraction (And It's So Strange...)" – The Ultraviolets
 "Next Time (I'll Dream of You)" – Flesh for Lulu
 "Walk on the Wild Side" – Edie Brickell & New Bohemians
 "It's the End of the World as We Know It (And I Feel Fine)" – R.E.M.
 "People Get Ready" – Bob Dylan
 "On the Road Again" – Canned Heat
 "Born to Be Wild" – Steppenwolf
 "Comin' Back to Me" – Jefferson Airplane
 "All Along the Watchtower" – Jimi Hendrix

References

External links
 
 
 

1990 films
1990s adventure comedy films
1990s buddy comedy films
1990s chase films
1990s crime comedy films
American adventure comedy films
American buddy comedy films
American chase films
American crime comedy films
Hippie films
Films about the Federal Bureau of Investigation
Films about friendship
Films directed by Franco Amurri
Films set in 1989
Films set on trains
Paramount Pictures films
Films with screenplays by David Loughery
1990 comedy films
Films scored by Barry Goldberg
1990s English-language films
1990s American films